Emma Stang (1874–1927), was a Norwegian court official.  

She served as the overhoffmesterinne for Queen Maud of Norway.

She was married to Ole A. Stang.

References

External links
 The family tree of Emma Stang on Geni.com

1874 births
1927 deaths
Norwegian ladies-in-waiting
Mistresses of the Robes (Norway)